Jandiala is a village in Shaheed Bhagat Singh Nagar district of Punjab State, India. The village is administrated by Sarpanch an elected representative of the village.

Demography 
As of 2011, Jandiala has a total number of 385 houses and a population of 1893 of which 940 include are males while 953 are females according to the report published by Census India in 2011. The literacy rate of Jandiala is 75.67%, lower than the state average of 75.84%. The population of children under the age of 6 years is 179 which is 9.46% of the total population of Jandiala, and child sex ratio is approximately 967 as compared to Punjab state average of 846.

Most of the people are from Schedule Caste which constitutes 69.68% of the total population in Jandiala. The town does not have any Schedule Tribe population so far.

As per the report published by Census India in 2011, 569 people were engaged in work activities out of the total population of Jandiala which includes 516 males and 53 females. According to census survey report 2011, 79.61% of workers describe their work as main work and 20.39% workers are involved in Marginal activity providing livelihood for less than 6 months.

Education 
The village has a Punjabi medium, co-ed upper primary school founded in 1953. The school provide mid-day meal and free education to children between the ages of 6 and 14 as per Right of Children to Free and Compulsory Education Act.

Transport 

See also 
List of villages in India

References

External links 
 Tourism of Punjab
 Census of Punjab
 Locality Based PINCode

Villages in Shaheed Bhagat Singh Nagar district